Dino Zandegù (born 31 May 1940) is a former Italian professional cyclist. He is most known for winning the Points Classification at the 1967 Giro d'Italia. He also won the Tour of Flanders in 1967 as well. He retired from racing in 1972.

References

1940 births
Living people
Italian male cyclists
People from Cassano d'Adda
Tour de Suisse stage winners
Cyclists from the Metropolitan City of Milan
UCI Road World Champions (elite men)